The 1978 Portland Timbers season was the fourth season for the Portland Timbers in the now-defunct North American Soccer League.

Squad  
The 1978 squad

North American Soccer League

Preseason

Regular season

National Conference, Western Division standings 

Pld = Matches played; W = Matches won; L = Matches lost; GF = Goals for; GA = Goals against; GD = Goal difference; Pts = PointsSource:

League results 

* = Shootout winSource:

Postseason

Playoff bracket 

* = Shootout win; MG = Series decided by 30-minute mini-game (score of mini-game in 3rd column)Source:

Playoff results 

Source:

International friendlies

References

1978
American soccer clubs 1978 season
1978 in sports in Oregon
Portland
1978 in Portland, Oregon